North Korea Kidnapped My Daughter is a book by Japanese activist and NARKN founder Sakie Yokota. The book is about her daughter, Megumi, who was kidnapped in 1977 at the age of 13, in an incident related to a series of North Korean abductions of Japanese citizens from 1977 to 1983. Her family discovered the truth 20 years after the kidnapping. Saike put faith in North Korea for her daughter's fate. The book was translated by Vertical. In 2012, she and her husband Shingru wrote another book, Megumi e no Yuigon.

External links
North Korea Kidnapped My Daughter

2009 non-fiction books
Books about North Korea
Human rights abuses in North Korea
Japanese autobiographies
North Korean abductions of Japanese citizens
Vertical (publisher) titles